Haskell and Barker Historic District is a national historic district located at Michigan City, LaPorte County, Indiana.  The district encompasses 205 contributing buildings, 3 contributing structures, and 1 contributing object in a predominantly residential section of Michigan City. The district is named for the Haskell and Barker manufacturing company. It developed between about 1860 and 1960, and includes examples of Italianate, Gothic Revival, Queen Anne, Colonial Revival, Tudor Revival, and Bungalow / American Craftsman style architecture.  Located in the district are the separately listed John H. Barker Mansion and First Congregational Church of Michigan City.  Other notable buildings include the St. Stanislaus Koska Church (1922-1926), Rectory (1938), and Convent (1938), Consumer Service Company (1922), Michigan City School of Fine Arts (1908), Gilmore-Gardner Building (1925), Porter-Carrigan House (1895), Hutchinson House (1875), St Mary of the Immaculate Conception Catholic Church (1868) and Convent (1905), and Hartke House (c. 1860).

It was listed in the National Register of Historic Places in 2014.

References

Michigan City, Indiana
Historic districts on the National Register of Historic Places in Indiana
Houses on the National Register of Historic Places in Indiana
Italianate architecture in Indiana
Gothic Revival architecture in Indiana
Queen Anne architecture in Indiana
Colonial Revival architecture in Indiana
Tudor Revival architecture in Indiana
Historic districts in LaPorte County, Indiana
National Register of Historic Places in LaPorte County, Indiana